The Murrumbidgee electorate is one of the five electorates for the unicameral 25-member Australian Capital Territory Legislative Assembly. It elected five members at the 2016 ACT election.

History
Murrumbidgee was created in 2016, when the five-electorate, 25-member Hare-Clark electoral system was first introduced for the Australian Capital Territory (ACT) Legislative Assembly, replacing the previous three-electorate, 17-member system. The electorate is named after the Murrumbidgee River which flows through the electorate, with the word "Murrumbidgee" meaning "big water" in the Aboriginal Wiradjuri language.

Location
The Murrumbidgee electorate consists of the Woden Valley suburbs of Chifley, Curtin, Farrer, Garran, Hughes, Isaacs, Lyons, Mawson, O'Malley, Pearce, Phillip, Torrens, the Weston Creek suburbs of Chapman, Duffy, Fisher, Holder, Rivett, Stirling, Waramanga, Weston, the Molonglo Valley suburbs of Coombs, Denman Prospect, Whitlam and Wright, the South Canberra suburbs of Deakin and Yarralumla, and the eastern portion of the Tuggeranong suburb of Kambah.

On the original boundaries contested in 2016 Murrumbidgee included the entire suburb of Kambah. However the boundary redistribution conducted in 2019 transferred the western portion of Kambah to the Brindabella electorate in exchange for gaining the suburbs of Deakin and Yarralumla from the Kurrajong electorate.

Members

1Giulia Jones (Liberal) resigned on 2 June 2022. Ed Cocks (Liberal) was elected as her replacement on countback on 20 June 2022

See also
 Australian Capital Territory Electoral Commission

References

Electorates of the Australian Capital Territory